Nikolina Stepan (born 10 December 1988) is a Croatian long distance runner. She competed in the women's marathon at the 2017 World Championships in Athletics.

References

External links

1988 births
Living people
Croatian female long-distance runners
Croatian female marathon runners
World Athletics Championships athletes for Croatia
Place of birth missing (living people)
20th-century Croatian women
21st-century Croatian women